The Kinetta is a film scanner, capable of scanning various film formats at various resolutions, which evolved from an earlier digital camera project.

References

 NAB 2004 article (digitalcontentproducer.com)
 mavromatic article

External links 
 Official site

Camcorders